Jeremy Nelson MBE (born 1 April 1964) is a jazz broadcaster and television producer.

Education
Nelson was educated at Dulwich College (a boys' independent school in Dulwich, South London) and at King's College London, where he first began to DJ.

Career
After working on several pirate jazz radio stations, including KJazz, he joined the newly licensed Jazz FM in the late 80s. Having left Jazz FM in 1991, Nelson joined Kiss 100 and, along with former colleagues Sonita Alleyne and Chris Philips, founded the media production company Somethin' Else. The business has become the largest independent radio production company in the UK and is a leading cross-platform content producer. In 2009, Nelson succeeded Alleyne as CEO of Somethin' Else. He has also presented many BBC television and radio programmes, including It'll Never Work? for Children's BBC, which led to a presenter's role on the primetime Tomorrow's World show. He has also presented Formula Five and Radio 3's Jazz on 3.

He is a Fellow of The Radio Academy.

References

External links
 Somethin' Else with Jez Nelson on Jazz FM

1964 births
Alumni of King's College London
BBC Radio 3 presenters
British media executives
British radio personalities
Living people
People educated at Dulwich College